The South End is a neighbourhood within Halifax's urban area, in the Municipality of Halifax, Nova Scotia, Canada.

History

The areas south of South Street and west of the South Common were largely farmland and mixed-forest which led to the development of large estates that took advantage of their proximity to the former City of Halifax and garrison.

Over time, neighbourhoods began to develop outside the original city boundary and were annexed by the city. 

In 1918, one of Halifax's largest projects saw the completion of a major railway line, to serve a new railway station at the south end of the city's central business district. The new railway line had been under construction by the Intercolonial Railway and later Canadian Government Railways at the time of the Halifax Explosion, which blocked and badly damaged the city's North Street station. The new railway line through the South End was rushed into completion to accommodate the unexpected disaster. One result of the building of this railway line has been to geographically isolate parts of the peninsula, creating opportunities for wealthy and exclusive neighbourhoods to develop. Another legacy of the blasting work created during the construction of the South End railway cut was the infilling of parts of the Bedford Basin and Halifax Harbour to create freight-and-passenger ship docks, and railway yards.

Geography
The South End is located on the southern-half of the Halifax peninsula. The neighbourhood was originally bounded on the south by South Street, that being the few blocks located south of Citadel Hill.

Demographics
The South End has become the most prosperous region of Halifax, with a middle-class demographic.

The neighbourhood contains Halifax's densest census tract; census tract 2050004.02. The population density is approximately 113 people per hectare (approximately 11,300 people per km2).

Parks and recreation
Throughout the neighbourhood, the South End has many places where recreational activities can be enjoyed.

Sports Complexes
Dalplex
Dauphinee Centre
Huskies Stadium

Community Centres
The Local Council of Women Halifax
Regional Residential Services Society
UpLift

Fields
Gorsebrook Ball Field
St. Francis Ball Field
Wickwire Pitch

Libraries

Other than the Universities' libraries, there are several public-libraries within the South End.

Killam Memorial Library
Nova Scotia Provincial Library
Vernon Street Community Library

Museums
Canadian Museum of Immigration at Pier 21
Thomas McCulloch Museum

Parks
Balcom Square
Gorsebrook Park
Grainery Park
Marlborough Woods Park
Peace and Friendship Park
Point Pleasant Park
Raymond Taavel Park
The Halifax Urban Greenway Park

Pools

Dalplex
The Waegwoltic Club

Trails
The Halifax Urban Greenway Park

Transportation
The South End of Halifax is in a dense part of the Municipality of Halifax with different ways to travel.

There are many kilometres of avenues, lanes, roads, and streets that criss-cross throughout the neighbourhood. Robie Street which bisects the neighbourhood, and starts in the South End, is the main thoroughfare through the neighbourhood-and-the Halifax Peninsula.

On 1161 Hollis Street, Via Rail operates Halifax station.

The neighbourhood is serviced by many public transit routes, which is provided by Halifax Transit. 

Halifax Transit Routes
Route 4 (Universities)
Route 7A (Peninsula) (clockwise route)
Route 7B (Peninsula) (counter-clockwise route)
Route 10 (Dalhousie)
Route 24 (Leiblin Park)
Route 29 (Barrington)
Route 41 (Dalhousie-Dartmouth)
Route 84 (Glendale)
Route 135 (Flamingo Express)
Route 136 (Farnham Gate Express)
Route 137 (Clayton Park Express)
Route 138 (Parkland Express)
Route 158 (Woodlawn Express)
Route 159 (Colby Express)
Route 161 (North Preston Express)
Route 165 (Caldwell Express)
Route 168 (Cherry Brook Express)
Route 168 A (Auburn Express)
Route 168 B (Cherry Brook Express)
Route 182 (First Lake Express)
Route 183 (Springfield Express)
Route 185 (Millwood Express)
Route 186 (Beaver Bank Express)

Education
Within the South End, there are several levels of education available.

Inclusive education
The Halifax School for the Blind is administered by the Atlantic Provinces Special Education Authority (APSEA).

Halifax School for the Blind

Private schools
Armbrae Academy
Halifax Grammar School

Public schools
With the exception of the Conseil scolaire acadien provincial, all other public schools within the South End are administered by the Halifax Regional Centre for Education.

Conseil scolaire acadien provincial
École Mer et Monde

Elementary Schools
Inglis Street Elementary School
LeMarchant-St. Thomas Elementary School
Sir Charles Supper Elementary School
St. Mary's Elementary School

High Schools
Citadel High School

Junior High Schools
Gorsebrook Junior High School
Halifax Central Junior High School

Universities
Dalhousie University
University of King's College
Saint Mary's University
Atlantic School of Theology

References

Communities in Halifax, Nova Scotia